Lakshman Singh (26 August 1910 – 4 February 1996) served as the National Commissioner of the Bharat Scouts and Guides from April 1983 to November 1992. He was a recipient of the Padma Bhushan, an Indian civilian honour.

In 1988, he was recognised as the 194th Bronze Wolf by the World Organization of the Scout Movement for exceptional services to world Scouting.

References

External links
 http://www.bsgindia.org

1911 births
1996 deaths
People from Punjab, India
Scouting and Guiding in India
Recipients of the Padma Bhushan in public affairs
Recipients of the Bronze Wolf Award